Dinosaur Tales is a 1983 short story collection by Ray Bradbury.  Several of the stories are original to this collection.  Other stories were first published in Collier's and The Saturday Evening Post magazines.  The collection contains over 60 pages of illustrations by Gahan Wilson, William Stout, Steranko, Moebius, Overton Loyd, Kenneth Smith and David Wiesner.

Table of contents

 Foreword by Ray Harryhausen (1983) 
 Introduction by Ray Bradbury (1983) 
 "Besides A Dinosaur, Whatta Ya Wanna Be When You Grow Up?" (1983) 
 "A Sound of Thunder" (1952) 
 "Lo, the Dear, Daft Dinosaurs!" (1980) 
 "The Fog Horn" (1951) 
 "What If I Said: The Dinosaur's Not Dead?" (1983) 
 "Tyrannosaurus Rex" (1962) 
 Contributors

Editions
  (paperback, 1984) cover by Sanjulián

Reception
Dave Pringle reviewed Dinosaur Tales for Imagine magazine, and stated that "This book might make an appropriate Christmas present for someone young and simple."

Reviews
Review by Chris Henderson (1983) in Dragon Magazine, November 1983
Review by W. Paul Ganley (1983) in Fantasy Mongers 7, 1983
Review by Andrew Andrews (1984) in Science Fiction Review, Spring 1984
Review by John DiPrete (1985) in Science Fiction Review, Spring 1985

References

External links
 
 

1983 short story collections
Short story collections by Ray Bradbury
Dinosaur books
Living dinosaurs in fiction